Maarten van Trijp (born 6 October 1993 in Bergen op Zoom) is a Dutch former professional cyclist, who competed professionally between 2013 and 2019 for the , ,  and  teams.

Major results

2010
 1st Omloop der Vlaamse Gewesten
 2nd Overall Sint-Martinusprijs Kontich
2011
 1st GP Bati-Metallo
 1st Stage 3 Niedersachsen-Rundfahrt
 3rd Paris–Roubaix Juniors
2012
 9th Arno Wallaard Memorial
2013
 2nd Ronde van Midden-Nederland
 5th Overall Tour de Gironde
1st Stage 1
 5th Kernen Omloop Echt-Susteren
 6th Ster van Zwolle
 6th Omloop der Kempen
 8th ZLM Tour
2014
 5th Kernen Omloop Echt-Susteren
 5th Nationale Sluitingsprijs
 9th Ronde van Overijssel
2016
 1st Arno Wallaard Memorial
2017
 1st Dorpenomloop Rucphen
 1st Circuit de Wallonie
 4th ZODC Zuidenveld Tour
 5th Arno Wallaard Memorial
2018
 1st Stage 2 Tour de Serbie
 2nd PWZ Zuidenveld Tour
 2nd Ronde van Midden-Nederland
 3rd Dorpenomloop Rucphen
 8th Arno Wallaard Memorial

References

External links

1993 births
Living people
Dutch male cyclists
Sportspeople from Bergen op Zoom
Cyclists from North Brabant
21st-century Dutch people